The second season of The Kelly Clarkson Show began airing on September 21, 2020.

Episodes

References

External links
 

2
2020 American television seasons
2021 American television seasons